The Fargo-Moorhead (FM) Area Diversion Project is a flood control project on the Red River of the North that borders North Dakota to the west and Minnesota to the east. It was developed by the U.S. Army Corps of Engineers and the Metro Flood Diversion Authority. The project was expected to begin construction in early 2017 at a cost of $2.2 Billion.

Once operational, the Project will protect the Fargo-Moorhead metropolitan area from catastrophic flooding. Fargo has been challenged by flooding since the city was founded in the 1800s. The Red River flows north to Lake Winnipeg in Manitoba, Canada. The River has flooded the Fargo-Moorhead area numerous times including 1997, 2009 and 2011.

The Project includes a 30-mile Diversion Channel that starts just south of Horace, ND, an embankment south of the metro area and a series of levees along the Red River through the Fargo-Moorhead metro area.

History 

The Fargo-Moorhead metropolitan has a population of about 230,000. It is the largest urban area in North Dakota and a principal regional economic center. Fargo sits on the North Dakota western bank of the Red River, while Moorhead occupies the east bank. The area has a relatively low elevation and extremely flat topography.

The Red River has exceeded the National Weather Service flood stage of 18 feet at the United States Geological Survey (USGS) gauge in Fargo (Fargo gauge) in 52 of the past 114 years (1902 through 2015), and recently every year except 2012 from 1993 through 2013.  The U.S. Army Corps of Engineers started a Fargo-Moorhead Metro Feasibility Study in September 2008. Based on the findings, the cities of Fargo, Moorhead and the federal government agreed to share the cost for the $22 million study. The Draft Feasibility Report and Environmental Impact Statement were first published in 2010, followed by a supplemental Draft EIS.

In addition to the Red River, there are several tributaries that also flood and cause flood damage.  The tributaries include the Wild Rice River (ND), Sheyenne River, Maple River, Rush River, and Lower Rush River.

The goals of the study were to find a plan that reduced flood risk and damages to the Fargo-Moorhead area, restored or improved habitat along the rivers in the area, provided additional wetland habitat and recreational opportunities with flood risk management features.

The study looked at multiple alternatives that could reduce flooding including no action (continuing to use emergency measures and sand bags), non structural measures, flood barriers and levees, diversion channels and flood storage.

Two diversion concepts were carried forward at the end of the study including a diversion channel in Minnesota and a diversion channel in North Dakota. The cost of these projects was estimated to range from $1.032 billion to $1.462 billion.

After looking at the study and conclusions, the local sponsors including the cities of Fargo and Moorhead, Cass County and Clay County requested the North Dakota diversion plan be pursued. After further study, it was found the project would impact structures downstream all the way to Canada. The plan was revised and a storage area upstream and in-town levees were added to the plan.

The plan was recommended to the Corps and was federally authorized through the Water Resources Reform and Development Act in 2016.

Design 

The FM Area Diversion Project includes three components: A 30-mile diversion channel, in-town levees, and a southern embankment with upstream staging.

The Diversion channel is 1,500 feet wide and can move 20,000 cubic feet of water per second.  The upstream staging area is 32,500 acres that will only be used during times of extreme flooding with more than 35 feet in Fargo (10-year-event).

The three components combined reduce the river level during a 100-year flood from 42.4 feet to 35 feet, thus saving the metropolitan area from damage. Although it's not designed to prevent damages from a 500-year flood event, the FM area Diversion Project would reduce the river level in Fargo from 46.7 feet to 40 feet during a 500-year event, making larger flood events fightable.

The Diversion channel has an aqueduct and spillway for the Sheyenne River and the Maple River. The channel also crosses the Lower Rush River and the Rush River. The channel begins at the diversion inlet south of Horace, ND. The channel ends northeast of Argusville, ND, just across the river from Georgetown, MN.

The southern embankment temporarily and occasionally holds water during a flood event upstream, to the south of the metropolitan area. Control gates on the Red River and the Wild Rice River prevent damaging flood waters from flowing into the metro area. Waters flow through town at 35 feet and the rest is diverted into the channel to the west.

Similar projects 
 The city of Winnipeg built to the Red River Floodway in the 1960s to protect the city from the Red River. The project includes a diversion channel around the east of Winnipeg and cost an estimated $63 Million (CAD), approximately $360 million today. To date, the Floodway has been used more than 20 times and prevented more than $100 billion (CAD) in cumulative flood damages.
 The Shellmouth Reservoir is on the Assiniboine River in Manitoba and Saskatchewan, Canada. The Dam was built in the late 1960s and the outflow is controlled by a gated structure. The project protects the city of Winnipeg from flooding from the Assiniboine River.
 The Portage Diversion project, also known as the Assiniboine River Floodway, is near Portage la Prairie Manitoba. It includes a 29 km long diversion channel that drains directly into Lake Manitoba and prevents flooding downriver in Winnipeg. The project was built at a cost of $20.5 million in 1970.
 The U.S. Army Corps of Engineers built the Worcester Diversion Project in 1957 to protect the towns of Auburn and Millbury. The project was completed in 1960 at a cost of $5.2 million. The 11,300 foot open diversion channel allows potential floodwaters to go around Worcester and flow into the Blackstone River.  The project also includes a control dam.
 The W. Darcy McKeough Floodway is meant to reduce the threat of flooding for Wallaceburg, Ontario. The project includes a dam embankment, and a concrete control structure with two gates. The diversion channel is seven kilometers long and divers water into the St. Clair River.

Economics and the Public Private Partnership (P3) 
The FM Area Diversion Project would protect the local economy, which generates $4.35 billion in annual non-farming wages and over $2.77 billion in annual taxable sales along with $14 billion in property value.

The Project is also being constructed using a Public-Private Partnership. The Metro Flood Diversion Authority will use the P3 method to construct the diversion channel portion of the Project. The U.S. Army Corps of Engineers is using traditional design-bid-build methods to complete the southern embankment portion of the project. The Project will be the first federal U.S. Army Corps of Engineers project to ever be implemented using a P3 delivery method.

References

External links 
 FM Diversion Website

Tunnel construction
Fargo-Moorhead Area Diversion Project